(450 — 2 June 487) was the 23rd legendary Emperor of Japan, according to the traditional order of succession.

No firm dates can be assigned to this Emperor's life or reign, but he is conventionally considered to have reigned from 1 February 485 to 2 June 487.

Legendary narrative
, later to become Emperor Kenzō, is said to have been the grandson of Emperor Richū, and the son of Ichinobe-no Oshiwa. He would have been quite young when Emperor Yūryaku shot the arrow which killed his father during a hunting expedition; and this caused both Prince Woke and his older brother, Prince Oke, to flee for their lives. They found refuge at Akashi in Harima Province where they hid by living in obscurity. Histories from that period explained that the two brothers sought to blend into this rural community by posing as common herdsmen.

It is said that the Oke came by chance to Akashi; and at that time, Prince Oke revealed his true identity. This intermediary re-introduced the lost cousins to Emperor Seinei, who had by this time ascended to the throne after the death of his father, the former Emperor Yūryaku. Seinei invited both brothers to return the court; and he adopted both of them as sons and heirs.

At Seinei's death, he had no other heirs than Prince Oke and Prince Woke, whose father had been killed by Yūraku. At this point, Woke wanted his elder brother to become Emperor; but Oke refused. The two could not reach an agreement. The great men of the court insisted that one or the other of the brothers must accept the throne; but in the end, Woke proved to be more adamant. Prince Woke agreed to accept the throne; and Kenzō was ultimately proclaimed as the new Emperor—which created a sense of relief for all the people who had endured this period of uncertainty.

Kenzō is considered to have ruled the country during the late-5th century, but there is a paucity of information about him. There is insufficient material available for further verification and study.

Kenzō's contemporary title would not have been tennō, as most historians believe this title was not introduced until the reigns of Emperor Tenmu and Empress Jitō. Rather, it was presumably , meaning "the great king who rules all under heaven".

Kenzō's reign
The location of the palace is thought to have been in present-day Osaka Prefecture or Nara Prefecture.

Murray reports that the only event of major consequence during Kenzō's reign had to do with the filial respect he showed for his murdered father. Kenzō arranged to have his father's remains retrieved and re-interred in a mausoleum appropriate for the son of an Emperor and the father of another.

Kenzō died at age 37, reigning only three years. He too had no other heirs; so his brother would follow him on the throne.

The actual site of Kenzō's grave is not known. The Emperor is traditionally venerated at a memorial Shinto shrine (misasagi) at Osaka.

The Imperial Household Agency designates this location as Kenzō's mausoleum. It is formally named Kataoka no Iwatsuki no oka no kita no misasagi.

Consorts and children
Empress (Kōgō) : , Prince Oka-no-Wakugo's daughter (also Prince Iwaki's granddaughter and Emperor Yuryaku's great granddaughter)

Ancestry

See also
 Iitoyo (Empress Tsunuzashi)
 Imperial cult

Notes

References
 Aston, William George. (1896).  Nihongi: Chronicles of Japan from the Earliest Times to A.D. 697. London: Kegan Paul, Trench, Trubner.  
 Brown, Delmer M. and Ichirō Ishida, eds. (1979).  Gukanshō: The Future and the Past. Berkeley: University of California Press. ;  
 Murray, David. (1906).  Japan. New York: G.P. Putnam & Sons. 
 Ponsonby-Fane, Richard. (1959).  The Imperial House of Japan. Kyoto: Ponsonby Memorial Society. 
 Titsingh, Isaac. (1834).  Annales des empereurs du Japon (Nihon Ōdai Ichiran).  Paris: Royal Asiatic Society, Oriental Translation Fund of Great Britain and Ireland.  
 Varley, H. Paul. (1980). Jinnō Shōtōki: A Chronicle of Gods and Sovereigns. New York: Columbia University Press. ;  

 
 

Japanese emperors
5th-century births
5th-century deaths
People of Kofun-period Japan
5th-century monarchs in Asia
5th-century Japanese monarchs